Karim Touati (born 20 March 1985) is a Tunisian football defender.

References

1985 births
Living people
Tunisian footballers
CA Bizertin players
Espérance Sportive de Tunis players
EGS Gafsa players
Association football defenders
Tunisian Ligue Professionnelle 1 players